The Warm Springs Pools are two spa structures near Warm Springs, Virginia. The name was changed in the 20th century from "Warm Spring Pools" to "Jefferson Pools" before being returned to its original name in 2021.  The spa is part of The Homestead, a resort hotel in nearby Hot Springs.

The Gentlemen's Pool House is the oldest spa structure in the United States. The octagonal wood building was built in 1761. The spas are naturally fed by a  mineral spring. The men's spa holds  of constantly flowing water.

The Ladies' Pool House was built in 1836. The buildings have changed little over the years, being made of wood with a central pool and a roof that is open to the elements. There are small alcoves around the pool for clothes, and it is usual to bathe naked. Famous bathers include Thomas Jefferson, who spent three weeks in 1819 bathing three times day and described the waters in a letter to his daughter, Martha Jefferson Randolph, as being of "first merit".

The site was listed as Warm Springs Bathhouses on the Virginia Landmarks Register on November 11, 1968 and the National Register of Historic Places on October 8, 1969.

The then-Jefferson Pools were ordered closed by Bath County in October 2017 due to the deteriorated condition of the bathhouses becoming a safety hazard. The owner, The Omni Homestead Resort, reported that the pools would remain closed and stated that they were actively working to restore them. Work was originally slated to begin 2020 before being delayed by the COVID-19 pandemic. In the summer of 2021, Omni announced work was proceeding on the $3 million restoration project. The pools reopened in December 2022 following their rehabilitation.

References

External links

Official website
 "Taking the Waters: 19th Century Mineral Springs: Warm Springs." Claude Moore Health Sciences Library, University of Virginia

Buildings and structures on the National Register of Historic Places in Virginia
Infrastructure completed in 1761
Buildings and structures in Bath County, Virginia
National Register of Historic Places in Bath County, Virginia
Hot springs of Virginia
1761 establishments in Virginia